Mark Lovell (born 16 July 1983 in Beckenham) is an English footballer. He briefly played professionally for Gillingham. He is the son of former Welsh international striker Steve Lovell, and the grandson of former professional footballer Alan Lovell.

Playing career
Lovell joined Gillingham, one of his father's old clubs, as a trainee in 1999 and was soon a regular for the club's reserve team, prompting Gillingham to sign him to a professional contract when he was still 17 years old. He made his debut for the Gills' first team in a match against Watford in May 2001.

The following season Lovell found himself unable to gain a foothold in the first team squad and was loaned out to St. Leonards. In March 2002 he had a trial spell with Leyton Orient but was not taken on. Shortly after this his contract at Priestfield Stadium expired and was not renewed.

Lovell next had a trial with Margate but again was not taken on. He later had a spell with Hastings United before joining Sittingbourne.

In 2006 Lovell had a brief spell with Welling United but then rejoined Sittingbourne, where his father was now manager. In June 2007 he joined Dover Athletic, now managed by his former Gillingham manager Andy Hessenthaler, but in November 2007 left The Crabble to link up with his father, who had recently been appointed manager of Ashford Town (Kent). Following the club's withdrawal from senior football in 2010, Lovell joined Ramsgate.

Ahead of the 2017–18 season, Lovell joined Faversham Town

References

1983 births
Living people
English footballers
Footballers from Beckenham
Gillingham F.C. players
Welling United F.C. players
Dover Athletic F.C. players
Hastings United F.C. players
Sittingbourne F.C. players
Ashford United F.C. players
St. Leonards F.C. players
Faversham Town F.C. players
Tonbridge Angels F.C. players
Association football forwards